Mitromica decaryi is a species of small sea snail, marine gastropod mollusk in the family Costellariidae, the ribbed miters.

Description

Distribution

References

 Dautzenberg, Philippe. Mollusques testacés marins de Madagascar. Supplément, par Ph. Dautzenberg... Mme H. Fischer, 1932.

Costellariidae
Gastropods described in 1932